The European Credit Transfer and Accumulation System (ECTS) is a standard means for comparing academic credits, i.e., the "volume of learning based on the defined learning outcomes and their associated workload" for higher education across the European Union and other collaborating European countries. For successfully completed studies, ECTS credits are awarded. One academic year corresponds to 60 ECTS credits that are normally equivalent to 1500–1800 hours of total workload, irrespective of standard or qualification type. ECTS credits are used to facilitate transfer and progression throughout the Union.
ECTS also includes a standard grading scale, intended to be shown in addition to local (i.e. national) standard grades.

Current systems

See also
 Educational policies and initiatives of the European Union
 Bologna Process
 European Higher Education Area
 ECTS grading scale
 Carnegie Unit and Student Hour
 Erasmus Programme
 Academic mobility

References

External links
 European Commission ECTS information
 European Commission ECTS Users' Guide
 The Official Bologna Process - European Higher Education Area Website 2010-2020
 Erasmus+ website of the European Commission
 European Commission ECVET information
 Systemy Akumulacji i Transferu Osiągnięć Na Przykładzie ECTS I ECVET

Academic transfer
Educational policies and initiatives of the European Union
Universities and colleges in Europe